Princeton Historic District may refer to:

Princeton Historic District (Princeton, New Jersey), listed on the National Register of Historic Places in Mercer County, New Jersey
Princeton Downtown Historic District,  listed on the National Register of Historic Places in Green Lake County, Wisconsin